GBD may refer to:
 Gilberdyke railway station, in England
 Gigabaud (GBd)
 Great Bend Municipal Airport,  Kansas, US
 Global Burden of Disease Study
 Green Beer Day, Miami University tradition
 Gaobeidian East railway station, China Railway pinyin code
Great Barrington Declaration, a COVID-19 open letter